Evil Eyes is a 2004 direct-to-DVD horror film produced by The Asylum, directed by Mark Atkins, and starring Adam Baldwin.

Plot
The film centres on Jeff Stenn (Adam Baldwin), a successful writer who is happily married to his wife, Tree (Jennifer Gates). Jeff, due to a shortage of money, accepts a job to write a screenplay about a real-life homicide that happened 35 years earlier.  A seemingly psychotic director (Udo Kier) who believed that creativity had unleashed dark forces, killed his pregnant wife and in-laws for no apparent reason before committing suicide.

As Jeff continues to work on the screenplay, several accidents occur around him that directly mirror events in his script. Jeff begins to think that his writing has the power to affect reality, and must question whether finishing the script will bring about the death of his own family.

Main cast
Adam Baldwin - Jeff Stenn
Jennifer Gates - Tree Stenn
Udo Kier - George
Mark Sheppard - Peter
Kristin Lorenz - Nina
Peta Johnson - Marilyn
Eric Casselton - Gramm
Lanre Idewu - Bryce
Lee Anne Moore - Mrs. Marsh
Ronald Rezac - Tree's father
Julie Dickens - Claudia
Jason David - Greg
Byron James- Bob
Elizabeth Uhl - Judy
Mirjam Novak - Camille

References

External links
Evil Eyes at The Asylum

2004 horror films
2004 films
2004 independent films
2004 psychological thriller films
American supernatural horror films
The Asylum films
Direct-to-video horror films
American independent films
Films about screenwriters
American serial killer films
Films directed by Mark Atkins
2000s English-language films
2000s American films